Glen Head is a station along the Oyster Bay Branch of the Long Island Rail Road. It is officially located at Glen Head Road (Glenwood Road) and School Street in Glen Head, New York. However, parking is available between Glen Head Road and Locust Avenue on the east side of the tracks and between Glen Head Road and Walnut Avenue on the west side of the tracks.

History 
The village of Glen Head (and the station that serves it) got its name from being the initial terminus "head of the rails" for the Glen Cove Branch from January 23, 1865, to 1867. In July 1866 the Post Office changed the old name of the town from Cedar Swamp to Greenvale, but in February 1874 made another change to Glenwood. The railroad used the name Glen Head always and this has prevailed.

A new station building was opened in May 1888. It was a two-story red brick structure and contained elaborate gingerbread woodwork along the canopies. It was rebuilt again midway through 1961 with the current one-story cedar-shingled depot.

Station layout
The station has two high-level side platforms, each four cars long.

References

External links

Unofficial LIRR History Website:
Pre-1961 Glen Head Station
1961 Glen Head Station(from unidentified newspaper article)
June 2006 Station House and Platform Photos
 Station from Google Maps Street View

Long Island Rail Road stations in Nassau County, New York
Railway stations in the United States opened in 1865
1865 establishments in New York (state)